Chicago ORT Technical Institute, located in Skokie, Illinois, is part of a 130-year-old, worldwide network of more than 800 non-profit vocational training schools.

About Chicago ORT Technical Institute 

Chicago ORT Technical Institute is a nonprofit organization offering training programs in the following fields: Information Technology, Health Care, Graphic and Web Design and Accounting and English as a Second Language. The Institute is affiliated with ORT America, a volunteer organization that is the umbrella organization of ORT in the United States.

History 
ORT America opened Los Angeles ORT Technical Institute (LAORT) in October 1985 to serve both the Jewish population and the community at large in the Greater Los Angeles area. Chicago ORT Technical Institute was opened in March 1991 in Chicago, as a branch campus of LAORT, and was recognized as a main campus of the institution in 2006.  In 2012, Chicago ORT Technical Institute legally separated from LAORT to form Chicago ORT Technical Institute d/b/a Zarem/Golde ORT Technical Institute.

World ORT 
The World Organization for Educational Resources and Technological Training (World ORT) operates a worldwide network of over 800 schools and training centers with an enrollment of more than 200,000 students in 60 countries. World ORT is the world’s largest Jewish education and vocational training non-governmental organization.

In 2007, American ORT and Women’s American ORT  merged to create ORT America, a Jewish organization. ORT America oversees the following ORT programs in the United States:
 Bramson ORT College (New York, NY) 
 Los Angeles ORT College (Los Angeles, CA)
 Chicago ORT Technical Institute (Skokie, IL)
 Hermelin ORT Resource Center (Detroit, MI)

Affiliates 
US ORT Operations, Inc. in New York manages Chicago ORT Technical Institute in the northern suburbs of Chicago, Los Angeles ORT College in Los Angeles, California, and Bramson ORT College, a two-year college in New York City, New York. All three are post-secondary technical vocational schools dedicated to providing technology-based education that includes certificate, Associate and bachelor's degrees, and English as a Second Language (ESL) instruction in the ORT tradition.

Approvals 
Chicago ORT Technical Institute is licensed by the Illinois Board of Higher Education to operate and to grant associate degrees.  It is also approved by IBHE’s Division of Private Business and Vocational Schools to offer certificate programs.  The Institute is certified by the United States Department of Education as an eligible institution to administer Title IV federal funds. The Institute is also authorized by the Department of Veteran Affairs to enroll eligible veterans and is authorized by the U.S. Department of Homeland Security to enroll non-immigrant alien students.

Accreditation 
Chicago ORT Technical Institute is accredited by the Accrediting Council for Continuing Education and Training.  The Accrediting Council for Continuing Education and Training is listed as a nationally recognized accrediting agency by the United States Department of Education and is recognized by the Council for Higher Education Accreditation.

Articulation Agreements 
Chicago ORT Technical Institute has Articulation Agreements with the following colleges and universities:
 East-West University
 Westwood College 
 Solex College
 Bramson ORT College
 Los Angeles ORT College

International Students 
Chicago ORT Technical Institute is authorized by the U.S. Department of Homeland Security to enroll non-immigrant alien students.

Physical facilities 
The Institute is located at 5440 W. Fargo Ave., Skokie, IL 60077. The school contains laboratories, general-purpose classrooms, a learning resource center, a student lounge area, and administrative offices. Chicago ORT Technical Institute facilities and equipment fully comply with all federal, state, and local ordinances and regulations, including requirements pertaining to fire safety, building safety, and access for disabled individuals. Additionally, the Institute is committed to equal access for students with disabilities.

Admissions 
To apply for admission to Chicago ORT Technical Institute, applicants must be high school graduates, possess a GED or equivalent, and should have reached compulsory age. The compulsory age is 17 years old and above, as defined by the Illinois State Board of Education. The Admissions process includes a personal interview with an admissions representative and a tour of the Institute. The applicant is given a copy of the catalog, catalog supplement, consumer information (including tuition and fees), and current schedule of program start dates.

Student services

Career Services Department 
Advisors assist students with job hunting skills: resume and cover letter writing, necessary interviewing abilities and much more. The Institute offers current students and alumni job leads, personalized job advising, and workshops geared toward professionalism in the workplace.

Financial aid 
US Department of Education Title IV Programs, payment plans, as well as institutional scholarships are available for eligible students.

Learning Center 
The Learning Center is available seven days a week to all students. The staff provides tutoring assistance and offers individual attention to students for no extra cost.

Transportation and Parking 
School-supplied transportation is also available for a nominal fee. Convenient, free parking is available for students, faculty and staff at the school or at a nearby parking lot.

Housing 
The Institute does not maintain housing accommodations for students.

See also
 List of Jewish universities and colleges in the United States
Bramson ORT College
World ORT

References

External links 
 Official homepage

Education in Skokie, Illinois
Jewish universities and colleges in the United States
Two-year colleges in the United States
Universities and colleges in Cook County, Illinois
Private universities and colleges in Illinois